Kraemer is a census-designated place (CDP) in Lafourche Parish, Louisiana, United States. As of the 2010 census, its population was 934. Its ZIP code is 70371. It is also known as Bayou Boeuf.

Demographics

Education
Lafourche Parish Public Schools operates public schools. Bayou Boeuf Elementary School, Sixth Ward Middle School, and Thibodaux High School serve the Bayou Boeuf area.

Government and infrastructure
Residents are served by the Ward 6 Senior Citizens Center.

Notes

Further reading
 

Census-designated places in Lafourche Parish, Louisiana
Census-designated places in Louisiana
Census-designated places in Houma – Thibodaux metropolitan area